The 1973 Romania rugby union tour of Argentina was a series of matches played between August and September 1973 by Romania national rugby union team in Argentina. The "Pumas" won both test matches against the European side.

Romania, then one of the best teams in Europe outside the Five Nations Championship, was called by Union Argentina de Rugby after the refusal of Rugby Football Union to send, as planned, the English national team, worried by political situation in Argentina, after the return of Juan Perón and the Ezeiza massacre.

Results

San Isidro Club: Arturo Rodríguez Jurado; M.Walther, F.Cirio, Roberto Matarazzo, J.Otaola; F.González Victorica, M.Cutler; Miguel Iglesias (capt.), R.Lucke, Jorge Carracedo; A.Díaz Manini, J.Rodríguez Jurado; Fernando Insúa, O.Rocha e I.Alcázar.
 Romania: Radu Durbac; Ion Constantin, Petre Motrescu, Gheorghe Nica, Dumitru Teleasa; Mihai Nicolescu, Petre Florescu (capt.); Enciu Stoica, Gheorghe Daraban, Constantin Fugigi; Nicolae Postolache, Alexander Atanasiu; Mihai Ciornei, Valeriu Iorguescu, Nicolae Baciu.

Buenos Aires: Martin Alonso; M.Walther, Eduardo Morgan (capt.), A.Capelletti, G.Pérez Leirós; A.Brown, R.Rinaldi; E.Miguens, R.Sanz, Miguel Iglesias; R.Castro, C.Bottarini; M.Giargia, G.Casas, O.Carbone.
 Romania: Radu Durbac; Ion Constantin, Petre Motrescu, Gheorghe Nica, Dumitru Teleasa; Mihai Nicolescu, Petre Florescu (capt.); Constantin Fugigi, Nicolae Postolache, Alexandru Atanasiu; Gheorghe Dumitru, Gheorghe Darraban; Mircea Ciornel, F.Popovici, Constantin Dinu. 

Combinado del Interior: J.Viders; M.Brandi.O.Terranova, R.Tarquini, C.Dora; C.Navesi, L.Chacón; L.Lavesi, M.Chesta (capt.), J.Nazasi; J.Mangiamelli, R.Pasaglia; R.Fariello, J.Costante, A.Furno.
 Romania: Radu Durbac; Ion Constantin, Andrei Hariton, Gheorghe Nica, Dumitru Teleasa; Mihai Nicolescu, Petre Florescu (capt.); Constantin Fugigi, Florin Constantin, Alexandru Atanasiu; Gheorghe Dumitru, N.Postolache; Nicolae Baciu, Valeriu Iorgulescu, Constantin Dinu.

	

 Rosario: A.Rodríguez; C.García (capt.), R.Rodríguez, C.Blanco, A.Knight; J.Escalante, R.Castañeda; V.Macat, R.Covella, E.Mainini; M.Senatore, G.Todeschini; A.Risler, J.Costante, P.Sandionigi.
 Romania: Nicu Duta; Dumitru Teleasa, Gheorghe Nica (capt.), Andrei Hariton e Ion Constantin; Radu Durbac, Vasile Tata; Constantin Fugigi, Florin Constantin, Alexandru Atanasiu; Gheorghe Daraban, Gheorghe Dumitru; Mircea Ciornei, Valeriu Iorgulescu, Constantin Dinu.

References
 Union Argentina de Rugby – Memorias 1973

1973 rugby union tours
1973
1973
1973 in Argentine rugby union
1973 in Romanian sport
1973–74 in European rugby union